Air Chief Marshal (Retired) Chappy Hakim, is the 14th Chief of Staff of the Indonesian Air Force who assumed his appointment from 2002 to 2005.

Career 
In 2019, ACM (Ret’d) Chappy Hakim founded and led PSAPI - the Indonesian Center for Air Power Studies or ICAP - Indonesia Center for Air Power Studies. PSAPI is composed of academics and practitioners in the field of aerospace with the main activity of conducting discussions and studies of various issues of Air and Space which are donated to decision makers through formal channels and through the media.

He is the 2nd of 7 children in the family of Abdul Hakim, a journalist and the founder of Antara News Agency, and Zubainar Hakim. Born in Yogyakarta on December 17, 1947, he attended kindergarten to high schools in Jakarta.

In 1961 he played the "Band Cilik" film with Mangapul Panggabean, Wolly Sutinah, Atmonadi and Soes D.A where Ling Inata was the film director.  

After graduating from the Armed Forces Academy (better known as Akabri) - the Air Branch in 1971, Chappy Hakim attended the Air Force Pilot School and graduated in 1973, then he was assigned to Squadron 2 Light Transport at Halim Air Force Base which flew the Dakota type aircraft. Next, he was assigned as a seconded pilot to the Indonesian Army Aviation Unit, and on civil aviation, which includes PENAS, MNA and Mandala Airlines. At Mandala Airlines, Chappy Hakim flew a Vickers Viscount type aircraft and obtained an ATPL (Airline Transport Pilot License) license. Then he returned to the Air Force and flew C-130 Hercules Heavylift Transport until he was trusted to be the Commander of the 31st Squadron.

In the development of his following career, he attended the Junior Command School (SEKKAU), SIP (Flying Instructor School), the Air Command and Staff College (Seskoau), the Joint Armed Forces Command and Staff College (Seskogab) and the Indonesian National Resilience College  (Lemhannas).

In addition to domestic education, he has also attended a variety of overseas education, including the Flight Test and Aircraft Development Course, BAE Brough England / UK, Instructor Course C-130 Simulator in Lockheed, Georgia, USA, ADF Joint Exercise Planning Staff, Australia, Observer Training Course, USAFA, Colorado Spring, USA and Short Course on Aerodynamic, Cranfield Institute of Technology, UK.

Furthermore, he has held a number of strategic positions. These, among others, are Commander of 31st Squadron Heavylift Transport. Commander of Sulaiman Air Force Base, Margahayu, Bandung, West Java, Director of Air Force Operations and Training, Governor/Superintendent of the Air Force Academy, Assistant to the Chief of Air Force Staff for Personnel, Commanding  General of the Indonesian Military Academy and Chief of Staff of the Air Force Staff (Chief of the Indonesian Air Force).

During the tenure of his office as Chief of Staff of the Air Force from 2002 to 2005, it is noted there were records of such important events as the continuation of the Sukhoi fighter plane procurement process and the Bawean Incident (violation of Indonesia’s airspace by US Navy fighter aircraft).

As a pilot, he had more than 8 thousand flying hours on several types of aircraft, including the L-4J Piper Cub, T-41D Cessna, T-34A Mentor, Jet Trainer L-29 Dolphine, C-47 / DC-3. Dakota, VC-8 Vickers Viscount and C-130 H / L-100 Hercules. And Flew at VIP Pilot President

In 2007, when there were many airplane accidents, he was assigned by the President of the Republic of Indonesia as Chairman of the National Committee for Transportation Safety (KNKT).

His works have won five records from the Indonesian Museum of Records (MURI), including "The Best Publisher of The Year"  by publishing more than 160 books from all Air Force units in the period of one year. He is also the one who initiated the term "Tanah Air Udara Indonesia" .

He was accused of assaulting Commission VII member Mukhtar Tompo after a hearing with several representatives of mining companies, including Freeport Indonesia, after which he resigned as Director of Freeport Indonesia.

Due to his deep knowledge and wide expertise, Chappy Hakim has been invited to become a keynote speaker on Aviation and Defense in various mainstream media, social media, radio and television.

He has written numerous articles to aviation think-thanks as a proponent of Indonesia improving its aviation sector. He has pointed out notable flaws in the management of numerous airports around the country which have faced an inability to handle increasingly busy air traffic lanes and greater influx of passengers. He has also written on Indonesia's lack of management of its own airspace due to the country's inability to meet safety standards specified by the International Civil Aviation Organisation (ICAO). In an interview, he said that he avoided flying with Lion Air or other Indonesia Airlines, with the exception of Garuda as he did not believe that the other Indonesian airlines did maintenance and training properly. He criticized the Indonesian government for poor national planning which has favoured civil commercial flights over the country's own national air defense and covered up the occurrence of aviation accidents.

Overseas education 

 Flight Test and Aircraft Development Course, BAE Brough England/UK.
 Instructor Course C-130 Simulator di Lockheed Georgia USA
 Joint Exercise Planning Staff ADF, Australia.
 Observe Training Course USAFA Colorado Spring, USA.
 Short Course On Aerodynamic Cranfield Institute of Technology, United Kingdom

Position 

 Commander of 31st Squadron Heavylift Transport
Commander of Sulaiman Air Force Base Margahayu, Bandung, West Java
Director of Air Force Operations and Training
Governor/Superintendent of the Air Force Academy
Assistant to the Chief of Air Force Staff for Personnel
Commanding  General of the Indonesian Military Academy
Chief of Staff of the Air Force Staff (Chief of the Indonesian Air Force).
President Director of Freeport Indonesia

Honours
: Meritorious Service Medal (Military) (P.J.G.)
: First Class (Tong-il) of the Order of National Security Merit

Bibliography

Books 
 Air Diplomacy
 Dari Segara ke Angkasa
 Cat Rambut Orang Yahudi
 Awas Ketabrak Pesawat
 Berdaulat di Udara
 Pelangi Dirgantara
 Saksofon
 Kapal Induk dan Human Error
 Pertahanan Indonesia – Angkatan Perang Negara Kepulauan
 Tanah Air Udara ku Indonesia
 Freeport – catatan pribadi
 Abdul Hakim Wartawan Antara dalam kenangan anak cucu
 Defence and Aviation
 Quo Vadis Kedaulatan Udara Indonesia
 Menjaga Ibu Pertiwi dan Bapak Angkasa
 Air Force Leadership
 Believe it or Not Dunia Penerbangan Indonesia
 Fenomena Pompa Bensin
 FIR di Kepulauan Riau
 Saya Pengen Jadi Pilot
 Tol Udara Nusantara
 Menata Ulang Penerbangan Nasional
 Rute Penerbangan Pemersatu Bangsa
 Band The Playsets
 Penegakan Kedaulatan Negara di Udara

Keynote speaker at various international forums 
 United States-Indonesia (Usindo) in Washington D.C.
 Kokoda Foundation Canberra
 Australia. Regional Air Power Conference in LIMA
 Langkawi Malaysia
 Seminar on National Resilience at Lemhannas
 Keynote Speaker at the IATEC Conference
 AMROI International Conference
 Air Power International Seminar

Other strategic positions 
 Senior Advisor at PT Danone Aqua
 Senior Advisor and CEO at PT Freeport Indonesia
 President Commissioner of PTDI
 Expert Staff Official and Advisor

 Minister of Transportation of the Republic of Indonesia
 Minister of Marine Affairs and Fisheries
 Task Force 115 INACOM of the Ministry of Industry

References

 Biography of Air Chief Marshal Chappy Hakim

|-
 

1947 births
Living people
Indonesian Air Force air marshals
Chiefs of Staff of the Indonesian Air Force